Hope Cooke (born June 24, 1940) was the "Gyalmo" (Queen Consort) of the 12th Chogyal (King) of Sikkim, Palden Thondup Namgyal. Their wedding took place in March 1963. She was termed Her Highness The Crown Princess of Sikkim and became the Gyalmo of Sikkim at Palden Thondup Namgyal's coronation in 1965.

Palden Thondup Namgyal eventually was the last king of Sikkim as a protectorate state under India. By 1973, both the country and their marriage were crumbling; soon Sikkim was merged into India. Five months after the takeover of Sikkim had begun, Cooke returned to the United States with her two children and stepdaughter to enroll them in schools in New York City. Cooke and her husband divorced in 1980; Namgyal died of cancer in 1982.

Cooke wrote an autobiography, Time Change (Simon & Schuster 1981) and began a career as a lecturer, book critic, and magazine contributor, later becoming an urban historian. In her new life as a student of New York City, Cooke published Seeing New York (Temple University Press 1995); worked as a newspaper columnist (Daily News); and taught at Yale University, Sarah Lawrence College, and Birch Wathen, a New York City private school.

Early life and family 
Cooke was born in San Francisco to John J. Cooke, a flight instructor, and Hope Noyes, an amateur pilot. She was raised in the Episcopal Church. Her mother, Hope Noyes, died in January 1942 at age 25 when the plane she was flying solo crashed.

After her mother's death, Cooke and her half-sister, Harriet Townsend, moved to a New York City apartment across the hall from their maternal grandparents, Helen (Humpstone) and Winchester Noyes, the president of J.H. Winchester & Co., an international shipping brokerage firm. They were raised by a succession of governesses. Her grandfather died when she was 12, her grandmother, three years later. Cooke became the ward of her aunt and uncle, Mary Paul (Noyes) and Selden Chapin, a former US Ambassador to Iran and Peru. She studied at the Chapin School in New York and attended the Madeira School for three years before finishing high school in Iran.

Marriage to the Crown Prince of Sikkim 

In 1959, Cooke was a freshman majoring in Asian Studies at Sarah Lawrence College and sharing an apartment with actress Jane Alexander. She went on a summer trip to India and met Palden Thondup Namgyal, Crown Prince of Sikkim, in the lounge of the Windamere Hotel in Darjeeling, India. He was a recent widower with two sons and a daughter and, at age 36. They were drawn to each other by the similar isolation of their childhoods. Two years later, in 1961, their engagement was announced, but the wedding was put off for more than a year because astrologers in both Sikkim and India warned that 1962 was an inauspicious year for marriages.

On March 20, 1963, Cooke married Namgyal in a Buddhist monastery in a ceremony performed by fourteen lamas. Wedding guests included members of Indian royalty, Indian and Sikkimese generals, and the US Ambassador to India, John Kenneth Galbraith. Cooke renounced her United States citizenship as required by Sikkim's laws and also as a demonstration to the people of Sikkim that she was not an "American arm" in the Himalayas. She was dropped from the Social Register but the marriage was reported in National Geographic magazine. The New Yorker followed the royal couple on one of their yearly trips to the United States. Although her husband was Buddhist, Cooke did not officially convert from Christianity to Buddhism though she had practiced Buddhism from an early age (Henry Kissinger once remarked "she has become more Buddhist than the population"). Namgyal was crowned monarch of Sikkim on April4, 1965. However, their marriage faced strains, and both had affairs: he with a married Belgian woman, and she with an American friend.

At the same time, Sikkim was under strain due to annexation pressures from India. Crowds marched on the palace against the monarchy. Cooke's husband was deposed on April10, 1975 and confined to his palace under house arrest. The couple soon separated. Cooke returned to Manhattan, where she raised her children, Palden and Hope Leezum. In May 1975, Representative James W. Symington (D-MO) and Senator Mike Mansfield (D-MT) sponsored private bills to restore her citizenship; however, after the bill passed the Senate, several members of the House Judiciary Subcommittee on Immigration objected, and the bill had to be amended to grant her only U.S. permanent resident status before it could gain their support and pass Congress. President Gerald Ford signed the bill into law on June16, 1976. By 1981 she still had not been able to regain U.S. citizenship. The royal couple divorced in 1980, and Namgyal died of cancer in 1982 in New York City.

Later life 
With child support from Namgyal and an inheritance from her grandparents, Cooke rented an apartment in the Yorkville area of New York City. This time around, she felt "profoundly displaced" in the city and started going on walking tours and then creating her own. She studied Dutch journals, old church sermons, and newspaper articles to acquaint herself with the city and lectured on the social history of New York. She wrote a weekly column, "Undiscovered Manhattan", for the Daily News. Her books include an award-winning memoir of her life in Sikkim, Time Change: An Autobiography (1981), an off-the-beaten-path guide to New York, Seeing New York, developed from her walking tours, and, with Jacques d'Amboise, she published Teaching the Magic of Dance.

Cooke remarried in 1983 to Mike Wallace, a Pulitzer Prize-winning historian and Distinguished Professor of History at John Jay College of Criminal Justice. They later divorced. Hope Cooke's son, Prince Palden, a New York banker and financial advisor, married Kesang Deki Tashi and has a son and three daughters. Cooke's daughter, Princess Hope, graduated from Milton Academy and Georgetown University, and married (and later divorced) Thomas Gwyn Reich, Jr., a US Foreign Service officer; she later remarried, to Yep Wangyal Tobden.

Cooke lived in London for a few years before returning to the United States, where she now lives in Brooklyn and currently works as a writer, historian, and lecturer. She was a consultant for PBS's New York: A Documentary Film (1999–2001). Cooke is a regular contributor to book reviews and magazines and also lectures widely.

Publications 
 Time Change: An American Women's Extraordinary Story, New York: Simon & Schuster (1981); .
 Teaching the Magic of Dance (with Jacques d'Amboise), New York: Simon & Schuster (1983); .
 Seeing New York: History Walks for Armchair and Footloose Travelers, Philadelphia: Temple University Press (1995); .
 Cooke wrote several articles for the Bulletin of Tibetology, published by the Namgyal Institute of Tibetology.

References

Bibliography 
 Crowning of Hope Cook, Sarah Lawrence '63' in Life, April 23, 1965. p. 37
 How is Queen Hope getting along? Life, May 20, 1966, Page 51
 "Hope Cooke: From American Coed to Oriental Queen". Sarasota Herald-Tribune (August 2, 1964)

External links 
 "Where There's Hope", TIME, March 29, 1963
 LIFE 23 Apr 1965
 "Sikkim: A Queen Revisited", TIME, January 3, 1969
 University of Hawaii Museum. Sikkim – Woman's Informal Ensemble. (Kho dress worn by Hope Cooke in the 1960s, on Flickr).

1940 births
Living people
Writers from San Francisco
Sarah Lawrence College alumni
Sarah Lawrence College faculty
New York Daily News people
Hope
Sikkim monarchy
Chapin family
Indian exiles
American autobiographers
American debutantes
American people of Irish descent
American columnists
Tour guides
21st-century American historians
Writers from Manhattan
American women historians
Women from Sikkim
Women autobiographers
Madeira School alumni
Yale University faculty
Indian Anglicans
20th-century American Episcopalians
21st-century American Episcopalians
American expatriates in Iran
Chapin School (Manhattan) alumni
21st-century American women writers
American women columnists
20th-century American women